Russellville is a city in Franklin County in the U.S. state of Alabama. At the 2020 census, the population of the city was 10,855, up from 9,830 at the 2010 census. The city is the county seat of Franklin County.

History
After the War of 1812, the U.S. government appropriated money to improve a route from Nashville to New Orleans. It was named Jackson's Military Road after Andrew Jackson, and it passed through what became Russellville. (Present-day Jackson Avenue and Jackson Highway, U.S. Route 43, follow portions of the original road.)

Russellville is named after Major William Russell, an early settler in the area who helped in the construction of Jackson's Military Road. The town grew at this road's intersection with the Gaines Trace.

Russellville was incorporated on November 27, 1819.<ref name="alabama-law-1823">'A Digest of the Laws of the State of Alabama: Containing the Statutes and Resolutions in Force at the End of the General Assembly in January, 1823.  Published by Ginn & Curtis, J. & J. Harper, Printers, New-York, 1828. Title 62. Chapter XXIV. Pages 812-813. "An Act to Establish and Incorporate the Town of Russelville, in County of Franklin.—Passed November 27, 1819." (Google Books)</ref>

Russellville served as the first county seat from 1818-1849 before it was removed to Frankfort (which served from 1849-1879). After the fire at the courthouse in the third county seat of Belgreen in 1890, the seat was returned to Russellville in 1891.

Geography
Russellville is located in northeastern Franklin County. U.S. Route 43 passes through the eastern side of the city, leading north  to Muscle Shoals on the Tennessee River and southwest  to Hamilton. Alabama State Route 24 passes through the south side of the city, leading east  to Decatur on the Tennessee River and west  to Red Bay at the Mississippi border.

Climate

Demographics

2010 census
At the 2010 census, there were 9,830 people and 3,556 households. The racial makeup of the city was 73.68% White, 11.25% Black or African American, 0.35% Native American, 0.12% Asian, 0.27% Pacific Islander, 7.54% from other races, and 1.17% from two or more races. 12.64% of the population were Hispanic or Latino of any race.

There were 3,556 households, of which 30.6% had children under the age of 18 living with them, 50.9% were married couples living together, 12.6% had a female householder with no husband present, and 33.5% were non-families. 30.8% of all households were made up of individuals, and 16.0% had someone living alone who was 65 years of age or older. The average household size was 2.44 and the average family size was 3.03.

Age distribution was 24.2% under the age of 18, 9.8% from 18 to 24, 26.5% from 25 to 44, 21.6% from 45 to 64, and 17.9% who were 65 years of age or older. The median age was 37 years. For every 100 females, there are 89.6 males. For every 100 females age 18 and over, there were 85.3 males.

The median household income was $25,333, and the median family income was $35,799. Males had a median income of $27,238 versus $18,551 for females. The per capita income for the city was $14,871. About 16.7% of families and 22.2% of the population were below the poverty line, including 29.2% of those under age 18 and 24.9% of those age 65 or over.

2020 census

As of the 2020 United States census, there were 10,855 people, 3,238 households, and 2,244 families residing in the city.

Local features
Watermelon Festival - The annual "Watermelon Festival" is held each August in downtown Russellville, and includes music and entertainment, car and tractor shows, and arts and crafts.

Roxy Theater - Built in 1949, the theater originally served primarily as a movie cinema, but saw a major decline in the early 1980s. It now has been revitalized as an entertainment venue due to the efforts of The Franklin County Arts and Humanities Council and the support of local citizens.John Pilati, "Baldwin to Perform Benefit Concert This Saturday at Roxy," Franklin Free Press, 15 May 2018.

King Drive-In - The King Drive-In is located just north of Russellville on Highway 43. One of the few drive-in movie theaters still operating in Alabama, it plays currently released films throughout the spring and summer on Friday, Saturday and Sunday nights. The theater features old-style speakers that hang on car windows, but also offers the soundtrack of films through FM radio broadcasts, as well.

The Strip - From the 1960s until approximately 2000, "The Downtown Strip" had been a source of entertainment for local teenagers throughout Franklin County. This strip is best described as having the atmosphere of George Lucas' iconic film, American Graffiti. Cruising the strip ended near the end of 2004 due to an increased local police presence in the area.

RHS stadium - Russellville High School Stadium is a place where local residents watch the high school football team play. Russellville's football team ranks as one of the most successful teams in Alabama in terms of all-time playoff wins.

Local media
WMTY-TV features area events about the Russellville area including news and weather, though most programming is religious. Its translator station is W46DF-D. Radio stations include WKAX AM 1500, WGOL AM 920, and WPMR-LP 99.7 FM. Russellville's newspapers are The Franklin Free Press and the Franklin County Times.

Notable people
 Lee Clayton, rock and country musician and composer
 Luther Duncan, pioneer of 4-H youth development, a director of the Alabama Extension Service (now Alabama Cooperative Extension System) and president of the Alabama Polytechnic Institute (now Auburn University). Born near Russellville.
 Althea Brown Edmiston, Presbyterian missionary in the Belgian Congo
 Junius Foy Guin Jr., federal judge
 Gustav Hasford, writer and screenwriter. His semi-autobiographical novel The Short-Timers (1979) was the basis of the film Full Metal Jacket'' (1987)
 Joey Manley, webcomic publisher and author
 Sonequa Martin-Green, television actress
 Madeline Mitchell, Miss Alabama USA 2011
 Chucky Mullins, collegiate football player
 T. Ray Richeson, former professional football player and head coach of Livingston State College (now the University of West Alabama) from 1953 to 1956
 Thomas William Sadler, U.S. congressman from 1885 to 1887. Born near Russellville.
 Arron Sears, professional football player
 Joshua Heath Scott, founder of JHS Pedals

References

External links

City of Russellville official website
Russellville Police Department
Russellville page of Franklin County Chamber of Commerce 
Downtown Russellville Strip (unofficial "fan" site)

Cities in Alabama
Cities in Franklin County, Alabama
County seats in Alabama
Populated places established in 1819
1819 establishments in Alabama